Entwhistle Books was a small book publisher active from about 1968 to 2000. It was founded by Paul Williams, Chester Anderson, David G. Hartwell, and Joel Hack. Williams operated the publisher for most of its existence.

Entwistle published poetry and nonfiction books by Williams, and novels by the likes of Philip K. Dick, Anderson, Tom Carson, and others.

The company was based in Glen Ellen, California from 1976 to 1994, and then moved to Encinitas, California.

Titles (selected) 
 Anderson, Chester (as John Valentine), Puppies (1979)
 Anderson, Chester, with illustrations by Charles Marchant Stevenson. Fox & Hare: The Story of a Friday Evening (1980)  — "Introduction: the Making of Fox & Hare" by Paul Williams
 Carson, Tom. Twisted Kicks (1981) 
 Cole, Robert and Paul Williams. The Book of Houses: An Astrological Guide to the Harvest Cycle in Human Life (1980)
 Dick, Philip K. Confessions of a Crap Artist (1975)  — originally written in 1959
 Sturgeon, Theodore. Argyll; A Memoir (1993) 
 Williams, Paul and Family. Time Between (1972; republished in 2000) — "a hippie journal in the communes and on the road, December 1969–February 1970"
 Williams, Paul. Coming (1977)
 Williams, Paul. Dylan — What Happened? (1980) 
 Williams, Paul, ed., United Nations General Assembly. The International Bill of Human Rights (1981)  — foreword by Jimmy Carter
 Williams, Paul. Waking Up Together (1984)
 Williams, Paul. Heart of Gold (1991) — originally written in 1978
 Williams, Paul. Rock and Roll: The 100 Best Singles (1993) 
 Williams, Paul. Outlaw Blues: A Book of Rock Music, 2nd edition (2000)  — originally published (by E. P. Dutton) in 1969

References 

1968 establishments in California
Book publishing companies based in California
Defunct publishing companies